Party Time or Partytime may refer to:
 Party Time (The Heptones album), 1977
 Party Time (Arnett Cobb album), 1959
 "Party Time" (T.G. Sheppard song), 1981
Party Time?, a 1983 EP by Kurtis Blow
Partytime!, a 1998 special promotional CD release by Gloria Estefan
PartyTime (album), the Cheeky Girls' debut album
"Partytime" (song), a 1984 single by 45 Grave
Party Time (ClariS album), 2014
 Party Time (TV series), an Australian television series